Buttler is a surname. Notable people with the surname include:

 Jos Buttler (born 1990), English cricketer
 Ljiljana Buttler (1944–2010), Yugoslav-Romani folk singer

See also
 Butler (Mattew)
 Buttlar family, Upper Franconian-Hessian noble family